The 1984 Houston Cougars football team, also known as the Houston Cougars, Houston, or UH, represented the University of Houston during the 1984 NCAA Division I-A football season. The Cougars were led by 23rd-year head coach Bill Yeoman and played their home games at the Astrodome in Houston, Texas. The team competed as members of the Southwest Conference, finishing as co-champions with SMU with a conference record of 6–2. Houston was invited to the 1985 Cotton Bowl Classic, where they lost to Boston College.

Schedule

Roster

Game summaries

at Washington

vs. Boston College (Cotton Bowl)

References

Houston
Houston Cougars football seasons
Southwest Conference football champion seasons
Houston Cougars football